International Detective is a 1959 British TV series.

Plot
The global adventures of Ken Franklin, ace operative of the William J. Burns Detective Agency.

Cast
Art Fleming
Anthony Jacobs
Nigel Green

References

External links
International Detective at IMDb
International Detective at BFI

1950s British television series
1959 British television series debuts